Tributary is an unincorporated community in the New Manchester area of east Douglas County, Georgia, United States, consisting of a  master-planned mixed-use development built along the principles of New Urbanism.

The community consists of three major sections:
 Residential area

The community is planned with extensive space for parks and recreation, as well as pedestrian and cycling links, as part of the New Urbanist design.

References

Unincorporated communities in Georgia (U.S. state)
New Urbanism communities
Mixed-use developments in Georgia (U.S. state)